The Kunwinjku (formerly written Gunwinggu) people are an Australian Aboriginal people, one of several groups within the Bininj people, who live around West Arnhem Land to the east of Darwin, Northern Territory. Kunwinjku people generally refer to themselves as "Bininj" (meaning people, or Aboriginal people) in much the same way that Yolŋu people refer to themselves as "Yolŋu".

Language
They traditionally speak the Kunwinjku language.

Country
Their original heartland is said to have been in the hilly terrain south of Goulburn Island and their frontier with the Maung running just south of Tor Rock. Their northern extension approached Sandy Creek, while they were also present south-east at the head of Cooper's Creek and part of the King River. The Gumader swamps near Junction Bay and the creeks east of Oenpelli/Awunbelenja (now Gunbalanya) also formed part of their land.

Alternative names
 Gunwinggu
 Gunwingu
 Gunwingo
 Wengi, Wengei, Wengej
 Gundeidjeme
 Gundjeipmi
 Kulunglutji, Kulunglutchi
 Gundjeibmi, Gundjajeimi, Gundeijeme, Gundeidjeme
 Margulitban
 Unigangk, Urnigangg.
 Koorungo
 Neinggu/Neiŋgu. (Maung exonym)
 Mangaridji
 Mangeri.

Customs

Dzamalag was a form of ritualised ceremonial exchange or bartering practised by the Gunwinggu people.

Notes

Citations

Sources

Aboriginal peoples of the Northern Territory
Indigenous Australians in the Northern Territory